Javid Taghiyev may refer to:

 Javid Taghiyev (boxer) (born 1981), Azerbaijani boxer
 Javid Taghiyev (footballer) (born 1992), Azerbaijani footballer

See also
 Taghiyev